Sharon Little (born c. 1980) is an American singer-songwriter from North Wales, Pennsylvania.

Biography
While working as a waitress in Philadelphia, Little performed with local bands and independently released an album in 2006 titled Drawing Circles before being signed to CBS Records in early 2008. She was subsequently chosen as the opening act for Robert Plant, Alison Krauss and T Bone Burnett on their North American Raising Sand tour.  Her first album with CBS, Perfect Time for a Breakdown, was released on May 27 of that year. As part of her deal with CBS Records, several of her songs have been featured on CBS programs such as NUMB3RS and NCIS. The song "Follow That Sound" from Perfect Time for a Breakdown was also chosen as the theme for the A&E series The Cleaner. She was also featured performing the song in the show's fourth episode. She performed another track from that album, "Spaceship," in a sequence shot in New York's 34th Street subway station for an episode of CSI: NY. Little continued touring through 2008 and 2009 with, among others, Chris Isaak, Al Green and Jonny Lang. Perfect Time for a Breakdown reached No. 48 on the Billboard Heatseekers chart. Paper Doll, Sharon's newest album, was produced by Grammy-winner Don Was and is set for release in early 2011. Select tracks, including the title track "Paper Doll" and "Shake and Shiver," will be digitally released in advance of the album, in the fall of 2010.

Perfect Time for a Breakdown
Released in May 2008 just prior to embarking on a national tour with Robert Plant, Alison Krauss and T Bone Burnett for their Raising Sand album, Perfect Time for a Breakdown was Sharon Little's first release for CBS Records. It also continued her collaboration with songwriting partner Scot Sax (formerly of the band Wanderlust). Containing 11 original compositions, including the lead track "Follow That Sound" (which became the theme song for the Benjamin Bratt series on A&E, The Cleaner), the album received critical acclaim from many prominent media outlets including USA Today and Rolling Stone, who said, "Little's debut, Perfect Time for a Breakdown, showcases her deep, husky vocals over country-tinged folk rock that recalls Sheryl Crow and Jewel."

Songs from Perfect Time for a Breakdown has been featured on numerous TV programs, including NCIS, Ghost Whisperer, CSI: NY, NUMB3RS, and The Good Wife, and has sold over 20,000 copies to date.

Paper Doll
Returning to the studio, this time with producer Don Was (the Rolling Stones, Bob Dylan), Sharon Little's sophomore effort for CBS Records offers a broader musical palate, encompassing pop, rock, R&B and electronic soul in a ten-song manifesto of empowerment, independence, and a chronicle of the ups and downs of personal relationships. Two of its tracks, "Paper Doll" and "Shake and Shiver," will be released on a digital EP, along with a remix version of "Shake and Shiver" and a live version of another album track, "Pluto," in the fall of 2010. Release of the full album is unknown.

Partial list of Sharon Little's songs featured in television programs

Discography

Albums

 Drawing Circles (2006)
 Perfect Time for a Breakdown (2008)
 Paper Doll (2010)

References

External links
 sharonlittle.com The Official Sharon Little Website
 facebook.com/sharonlittlemusic Sharon Little Facebook page
 twitter.com/sharonlittle Sharon Little Twitter page

Musicians from Philadelphia
Living people
Singer-songwriters from Pennsylvania
Year of birth missing (living people)